Bahadurganj Assembly constituency is an assembly constituency in Kishanganj district in the Indian state of Bihar.

Overview
As per Delimitation of Parliamentary and Assembly constituencies Order, 2008, No 52 Bahadurganj Assembly constituency is composed of the following: Bahadurganj and Terhagachh community development blocks; Patharghatti, Ghangra and Lachhmipur gram panchayats of Dighalbank CD Block.

Bahadurganj Assembly constituency is part of No 10 Kishanganj (Lok Sabha constituency).

Members of Legislative Assembly 
List of Members of Legislative Assembly from Bahadurganj Assembly Constituency.

Election results

1977-2010
In November 2010 and October 2005 state assembly elections, Md. Tousif Alam of Congress won the Bahadurganj assembly seat defeating his nearest rivals Mohammad Maswar Alam of JD(U) and Sikandar Singh, Independent, respectively. Contests in most years were multi cornered but only winners and runners up are being mentioned. Md. Tousif Alam contesting as an independent candidate defeated Zahidur Rahman of Congress in February 2005. Zahidur Rahman of Congress defeated Awadh Bihari Singh of BJP in 2000. Awadh Bihari Singh of BJP defeated Zahidur Rahman, Independent, in 1995. Islamuddin Bagi of JD defeated Najmuddin of Congress in 1990. Najmuddin of Congress defeated Shital Prasad Sinha, Independent, in 1985 and Kalimuddin, Independent, in 1980. Islamuddin Bagi of JP defeated Md. Nazmuddin in 1977.

2020

References

External links
 

Assembly constituencies of Bihar
Politics of Kishanganj district